Véronique Collard (born 9 June 1963) is a Belgian long-distance runner. She competed in the women's 10,000 metres at the 1992 Summer Olympics.

References

1963 births
Living people
Athletes (track and field) at the 1992 Summer Olympics
Belgian female long-distance runners
Olympic athletes of Belgium
Place of birth missing (living people)